Šnjegotina Velika is a village in the municipality of Čelinac, Republika Srpska, Bosnia and Herzegovina.

References

populated places in Čelinac
villages in Republika Srpska